Barak Norman (c.1670–c.1740) was an English string instrument maker. He was the most important early English maker, noted for his viols and lutes. He also made violins, and was one of the earliest English cello makers. His work is characterized by beautiful modelling, good wood and very dark brown varnish; the tone is strong and rich. Early specimens are highly arched but later ones have medium arching and elaborate double purfling. The earliest recorded label (on a viol) is dated 1690.

References

Notes

British luthiers
1670s births
1740s deaths